Finding Rin Tin Tin is a 2007 Bulgarian–American family comedy film directed by Israeli filmmaker Danny Lerner. Based loosely on historical events, the film is the most recent in a long line that includes the character Rin Tin Tin.

Plot
The film tells the story of the original Rin Tin Tin, the legendary German Shepherd, found shortly before the end of World War I by American serviceman Lee Duncan as a shell-shocked puppy in Lorraine, France. The dog was taken to America and became the hero of several films made in the 1920s and 1930s.

Cast
 Tyler Jensen as Lee Duncan
 Ben Cross as Nikolaus
 Gregory Gudgeon as Gaston
 Steve O'Donnell as Johnson
 William Hope as Major Snickens
 Todd Jensen as Captain Sandman
 Ivan Renkov as Jacques
 Ian Porter as Lt. Bryant
 Garrick Hagon as The General
 Michal Yanai as Monique
 Wesley Stiller as Steve

As Rin Tin Tin
 Oskar
 Sunny
 Mira
 Zuza
 Lana (teenage)
 Andy (teenage)

Reception
Finding Rin Tin Tin is the lowest ranked film on the French site AlloCiné, compiling the ratings of several film critics and was unanimously ranked 1 star.

Lawsuit
In October 2008, Daphne Hereford, an American woman breeding progeny of the original Rin Tin Tin, asked a federal court in Houston, Texas to protect her rights to the Rin Tin Tin name. The judge ruled in favor of the filmmakers, declaring the use of the name in the film to be fair use.

References

External links
 

Rin Tin Tin
2007 films
2007 drama films
2007 independent films
Bulgarian drama films
American drama films
Bulgarian historical films
American historical films
English-language Bulgarian films
American children's drama films
American independent films
Bulgarian children's films
MoviePass Films films
Films about dogs
Films about films
American films based on actual events
Films set in the 1910s
Films set in the 1920s
Films set in the 1930s
Films set in France
Films set in the United States
Films shot in Bulgaria
2000s English-language films
Films directed by Danny Lerner
2000s American films